Infamy, in common usage, is the notoriety gained from a negative incident or reputation (as opposed to fame).  The word stems from the Latin infamia, antonym of fama (in the sense of "good reputation").

Roman law

In Roman law, it took the form of a censure on individuals pronounced by a competent authority in the state, which censure was the result either of certain actions which they had committed or of certain modes of life which they had pursued. Such a censure involved disqualification for certain rights both in public and in private law.

In canon law
Infamy is a term of art in Roman Catholic canon law. According to the Catholic Encyclopedia of 1913, infamy in the canonical sense is defined as the privation or lessening of one's good name as the result of the bad rating he has, even among prudent men. It constitutes an irregularity, a canonical impediment that prevents one being ordained or exercising such orders as he may have already received.

There are two types of infamy: infamy of law (infamia juris) and infamy of fact (infamia facti).

Infamy of law
Infamy of law is contracted in one of three ways. Either the law itself attaches this juridical ineligibility and incapacity to the commission of certain crimes, or makes it contingent upon the decision of a judge, or finally connects it with the penalty imposed by the judge. This kind of infamy is incurred chiefly by those guilty of duelling (whether as principals or seconds), rape (as likewise those who co-operate in it), attempt to marry during the lifetime of the actual consort, heresy, real simony, etc. Infamy of law may be removed either by canonical purging or by application to the Holy See.

Infamy of fact
Infamy of fact is the result of a widespread opinion, by which the community attributes some unusually serious delinquency, such as adultery or the like, to a person. This is more of an unfitness than an irregularity properly so called, unless sentence in court has been pronounced. It ceases therefore when one has shown by a change of life extending over a period of two or probably three years that his repentance is sincere.

A crime consisting in acts which society not only forbids but also considers as highly immoral and particularly dishonoring, as defined (variously) in certain legal systems, as in Poland; in its origin, in Ancient Rome, infamia was the mark of disapproval of the censors on moral grounds - often such 'legal immorality' is largely defined according to the state - or de facto dominant religion.

In the Polish–Lithuanian Commonwealth infamy (infamia) was a more severe form of exile sentence. A noble who has been sentenced to infamy, known as infamis lost the protection of the law and there was a reward for his death (this was similar to the common law concept of outlawry). In addition, a banished noble (banita) who killed an infamed one could expect his exile sentence to be revoked.

References

Reputation management